The 2015 Bravar Campeonato Brasileiro de Turismo (Brazilian Touring Championship), also known as Stock Car Brasil Light, was the third season of the Campeonato Brasileiro de Turismo, a second-tier series to Stock Car Brasil.

With a fourteenth-place finish in the final race at Interlagos, Márcio Campos clinched the championship title for the Motortech Competições team. Campos was the season's most prolific winner, winning six of the twelve races, including a run of four successive victories in the first half of the season. Despite this, Campos won the championship by only four points ahead of his closest challenger Dennis Dirani (Voxx Racing), who won races at Santa Cruz do Sul and Goiânia. Third place in the championship went to Edson Coelho Júnior from the J. Star Racing team. Three other drivers won races during the season; Marco Cozzi (W2 Racing) won the season-opening race at Goiânia, his team-mate Felipe Guimarães won at Interlagos, while the winner of the Cascavel race was Bravar Motorsport's Danilo Dirani. The trio finished sixth, seventh and eighth in the championship respectively. In the teams' championship, Motortech Competições won the championship by 24 points ahead of Voxx Racing.

Teams and drivers
All cars were powered by V8 engines and used the JL chassis. All drivers were Brazilian-registered.

Race calendar and results
All races were held in Brazil.

Championship standings
Points system
Points were awarded for each race at an event, to the driver/s of a car that completed at least 75% of the race distance and was running at the completion of the race, up to a maximum of 40 points per event. Double points were awarded at the final race.

Drivers' Championship

Teams' Championship

References

External links

Campeonato Brasileiro de Turismo
Stock Car Brasil